Dakota City may refer to several places:

Places
 Dakota City, Iowa
 Dakota City, Nebraska

Fiction
 Dakota City (comics), the main fictional setting of Milestone Media's comics universe